Anthidiini is a tribe of insects in the family Megachilidae. There are at least 40 genera and 840 described species in Anthidiini. There is strong evidence that the tribe is monophyletic.

Genera
 Acedanthidium Michener, 2000
 Afranthidium Michener, 1948
 Afrostelis Cockerell, 1931
 Anthidiellum Cockerell, 1904 (rotund resin bees)
 Anthidioma Pasteels, 1984
 Anthidium Fabricius, 1804 (wool-carder bees)
 Anthodioctes Holmberg, 1903
 Apianthidium Pasteels, 1969
 Aspidosmia Brauns, 1926
 Austrostelis Michener & Griswold, 1994
 Aztecanthidium Michener & Ordway, 1964
 Bathanthidium Mavromoustakis, 1953
 Bekilia Benoist, 1962
 Benanthis Pasteels, 1969
 Cyphanthidium Pasteels, 1969
 Dianthidium Cockerell, 1900
 Duckeanthidium Moure & Hurd, 1960
 Eoanthidium Popov, 1950
 Epanthidium Moure, 1947
 Euaspis Gerstäcker, 1857
 Hoplostelis Dominique, 1898
 Hypanthidioides Moure, 1947
 Hypanthidium Cockerell, 1904
 Icteranthidium Michener, 1948
 Indanthidium Michener & Griswold, 1994
 Ketianthidium Urban, 2000
 Larinostelis Michener & Griswold, 1994
 Melostelis Urban, 2011
 Notanthidium Isensee, 1927
 Pachyanthidium Friese, 1905
 Paranthidium Cockerell & Cockerell, 1901
 Plesianthidium Cameron, 1905
 Pseudoanthidium Friese, 1898
 Rhodanthidium Isensee, 1927
 Serapista Cockerell, 1904
 Stelis Panzer, 1806
 Trachusa Panzer, 1804
 Trachusoides Michener & Griswold, 1994
 Xenostelis Baker, 1999

References

Further reading

External links

Megachilidae